John Patrick O’Loughlin, M.S.C. (25 July 1911 – 14 November 1985) was the fourth Bishop of the Roman Catholic Diocese of Darwin, serving in this position from 22 May 1949 until his death on 14 November 1985, a well-above-average period of over 36 years.

References

1911 births
1985 deaths
20th-century Roman Catholic bishops in Australia
Roman Catholic bishops of Darwin